Nalband is a Persian language word with the meaning manufacturer of horseshoes. The word is derived from the Persian word nal, meaning horseshoe and band, a fastener.

People with the name are found in the states of Haryana, Punjab and Uttar Pradesh in India, and the province of Punjab in Pakistan, and in the Persian influenced Turkey, where they adopted the soft t sound spelling of Nalbant.

Origin 

Originally in India they were Muslim Lohars and who were found mainly in western Uttar Pradesh, Haryana and Punjab. The community claims to have been Mughal who took to the manufacturing of horseshoes, and as such separated from the parent community. There is no intermarriage between the two groups now. Other traditions point to the community being Muslim converts from the Lohar caste. At the time of partition of India, a majority of the Nalband migrated to Pakistan. There is only a rump community left in Haryana and Punjab. In Haryana, they are found throughout the state, and speak Haryanvi. While in Punjab, they are found mainly and around the town of Malerkotla, with a small number found in Ropar District. They speak Punjabi, with some members of the community having some knowledge of Urdu.

In Uttar Pradesh, the community have two sub-divisions, the Pathan and Shaikh. Each of these two sub-divisions have their own origin myth. The community is concentrated in western Uttar Pradesh, in particular the Doab region. Unlike the Nalband of Punjab and Haryana, the majority of Uttar Pradesh Nalband have remained in the state.

In Hyderabad, Telangana, there is a large Hindu family from Vishwabrahmin caste who migrated from Devarakonda, Nalgonda, Telangana in 1800s. They carry surname as Nalubandhu, Nalbandu, Nalband.

Present circumstances 

The Nalband of Punjab and Haryana are divided into two major groups, the Deshwali and the Multani. The former are said to be natives of Punjab and Haryana, while latter were migrants from Multan in Pakistan. Both groups intermarry, and unlike other Haryana Muslims, they do not practice clan exogamy. In Punjab, the community practices village exogamy, and have been strongly influences by Sikhism, as they live in villages that tend to be dominated by the Sikh community.

The Nalband are a landless community, that has seen a decline in its traditional occupation. Most are employed as daily wage labourers. A small number of Nalband are petty businessmen. A small number of Punjab Nalband are now cultivators.

The Nalband of Uttar Pradesh intermarry with the Saifi community, with whom they share many cultural traits. They are Sunni Muslims, and speak Urdu as well as local dialects of Hindi, such as Khari boli. The community perceives itself to be of Shaikh status.

The majority of the Nalband are now found in Pakistan, mainly in the province of Punjab. They have been resettled in districts in central Punjab, such as Faisalabad and Sahiwal.

See also 

Muslim Lohar

References 

Mughal clans of Pakistan
Muslim communities of India
Muslim communities of Uttar Pradesh
Punjabi tribes
Shaikh clans
Indian people of Turkic descent
Social groups of Haryana
Social groups of Punjab, India
Social groups of Punjab, Pakistan
Social groups of Pakistan
Social groups of Uttar Pradesh
Turkish-language surnames